The Principal Staff Officer, abbreviated as PSO, is the principal assistant and chief of staff to the head of the Armed Forces Division, usually the prime minister, of Bangladesh, the high command of the national armed forces. It is currently held by a three-star rank lieutenant general.

Role and functions 
The Principal Staff Officer is the head of Armed Forces Division, which is part of the Prime Minister's Office. He is assisted by a PS (acting PSO) & five departmental heads each one star rank military officer from Bangladesh Armed Forces.

Under the direct supervision and guidance of the Prime Minister he has the authority, direction, and control over all operational and administrative services. He also, as per government notification, performs the duties of a full-fledged Secretary with full administrative and financial authority as that of a Secretary in any other Division / Ministry.

Appointees 

The following table chronicles the appointees to the office of Principal Staff Officer.

References

Military of Bangladesh
Bangladesh
Principal Staff Officers (Bangladesh)